We Two Kings: Charlie Hunter and Bobby Previte Play the Great Carols is a 2015 Christmas album by jazz guitarist Charlie Hunter and drummer Bobby Previte.

Track listing

"Joy to the World" – 3:03
"It Came Upon a Midnight Clear" – 2:46
"Deck the Halls" – 3:14
"God Rest Ye Merry Gentlemen" – 2:58
"Hark! the Herald Angels Sing" – 3:20
"We Three Kings" – 3:56
"The First Noel" – 4:09
"Good King Wenceslas" – 2:59
"Angels We Have Heard on High" – 3:40
"Jingle Bells" – 2:45
"O Come All Ye Faithful" – 3:08
"Silent Night" – 3:12

Personnel 
 Charlie Hunter – seven-string guitar, electric bass, electric piano, organ, percussion
 Bobby Previte – drums, electric piano, organ, synthesizer, percussion
 Curtis Fowlkes – trombone on tracks 5, 7, 11

Production
 Charlie Hunter – producer
 Bobby Previte – producer

References

2015 albums
Charlie Hunter albums
Christmas albums by American artists
Jazz Christmas albums